Sofía Ramondegui Correa (born 26 March 2001) is a Uruguayan footballer who plays as a defender for CA Peñarol and the Uruguay women's national team.

Early life
Ramondegui was born in Nueva Palmira. She played youth football for Club Sauce and Palmirense.

International career
On 15 June 2021, Ramondegui earned her first cap for Uruguay in a 3–0 friendly victory over Puerto Rico at Estadio Luis Franzini.

References 

2001 births
Living people
Uruguayan women's footballers
Women's association football defenders
Uruguay women's international footballers